Chisocheton macrophyllus in the Mahogany family (Meliaceae) is a pachycaul rainforest tree of the East Indies and Malay Peninsula with very few upright limbs (reiterations) ultimately reaching a height of . Like all Chisocheton species, these leaves are indeterminate, forming a new pair of leaflets every few weeks or months. while the oldest pair may die.

References

macrophyllus
Taxa named by George King (botanist)
Flora of Malesia
Flora of the Nicobar Islands
Flora of Thailand
Plants described in 1895